The chucao tapaculo (Scelorchilus rubecula) is a species of bird in the family Rhinocryptidae. It is found in central Chile and adjacent Argentina; it has also been recorded in Chile's Magallanes Province.

Taxonomy and systematics

The chucao tapaculo has two subspecies. The nominate Scelorchilus rubecula rubecula is primarily found in central Chile from the Biobío Region south to the Aysén Region and the adjoining parts of Argentina. It has occasionally been recorded further north and once in the far southern Magallanes Province. The other subspecies, S. r. mochae, is found only on Mocha Island off the Chilean coast.

Description

The adult is dusky brown above; much of the face and the throat and upper breast are rufous. The rest of the breast is dark gray with white bars and the flanks and vent are reddish brown to olive brown.

Distribution and habitat

The chucao tapaculo occurs from sea level to  elevation.
Its habitat is temperate and humid forests. It is typically found in Chusquea bamboo thickets within Nothofagus forest but also inhabits secondary woodland.

Behavior

Feeding

The chucao tapaculo's diet is dominated by arthropods and seeds. It forages on the ground alone or in pairs. It usually remains hidden in dense foliage but occasionally feeds in more open areas.

Breeding

In Chile the chucao tapaculo lays eggs in September to October and in Argentina, November. Two to three eggs are laid. Both the male and female tend nestlings. This species showed a pattern of aggressiveness and territoriality towards the other species of tapaculos in the forest of southern Chile.

Vocalization

The chucao tapaculo has a loud song beginning and ending with soft churrs surrounding four or five clearer, louder, and higher pitched notes .

Status

The IUCN has assessed the chucao tapaculo as of Least Concern, though the population is thought to be decreasing. It seems vulnerable to fragmentation of its habitat.

References

External links
Chucao Tapaculo in IBC (Internet Bird Collection.
Chucao Tapaculo sounds in Xenocanto.

chucao tapaculo
Birds of Chile
Birds of Argentina
chucao tapaculo
Taxa named by Heinrich von Kittlitz
Taxonomy articles created by Polbot
Fauna of the Valdivian temperate rainforest